1 Vulpeculae is a class B4IV (blue subgiant) star in the constellation Vulpecula. Its apparent magnitude is 4.77 and it is approximately 780 light years away based on parallax.

The primary was discovered to be a spectroscopic binary in 1978 with a period around 250 days although the orbital elements are described as marginal. There are also companions B, with magnitude 11.6 and separation 39.1", and C, with magnitude 12.8 and separation 43.6".

Component A is also a suspected variable star, reported to vary from 4.57 to 4.77 in magnitude.  It was reported as possibly variable in 1952 during a search for β CMa variables, but has not been seen to vary since.  It was listed as one of the least variable stars based on Hipparcos photometry.

On 29 May 1983, 1 Vulpeculae was occulted by the asteroid Pallas. This event was observed at 130 locations in the United States and Mexico and was the best observed of all asteroid occultation events.

References

Vulpecula
B-type subgiants
Vulpeculae, 1
094703
7306
180554
Spectroscopic binaries
Suspected variables
Durchmusterung objects